The Armagh rail disaster happened on 12 June 1889 near Armagh, County Armagh, in Ireland, when a crowded Sunday school excursion train had to negotiate a steep incline; the steam locomotive was unable to complete the climb and the train stalled. The train crew decided to divide the train and take forward the front portion, leaving the rear portion on the running line. The rear portion was inadequately braked and ran back down the gradient, colliding with a following train.

Eighty people were killed and 260 were injured, about a third of them children. It was the worst rail disaster in the United Kingdom in the nineteenth century, and to this day remains the worst railway disaster in Irish history. It is the fourth worst railway accident in the history of the post-independence United Kingdom.

At the time, the disaster led directly to various safety measures becoming legal requirements for railways in the United Kingdom. This was important both for the measures introduced and for the move away from voluntarism and towards more direct state intervention in such matters.

Circumstances of the accident

The excursion sets out
A special Great Northern Railway of Ireland (GNR(I)) train was arranged for the journey, intended to carry about eight hundred passengers.

The railway route was steeply graded and curved, and the first  from Armagh railway station involved a steep continuous climb, up a gradient of 1 in 82 (1.22%) and then 1 in 75 (1.33%). Elsewhere on the line, there were gradients as severe as 1 in 70.2 (1.42%).

Asked to provide rolling stock for a special train to take 800 excursionists, the locomotive department at Dundalk sent fifteen vehicles hauled by a 'four-coupled' (2-4-0) locomotive; however, the instructions to the engine driver, Thomas McGrath, were that the train was to be of thirteen vehicles. There were more intending passengers than anticipated and, to accommodate the excursion, the Armagh station master decided to use all fifteen vehicles. McGrath, who had never driven the route before (but had been over it with excursion trains when a fireman), objected to these instructions, saying that his instructions were that the train was to be of thirteen vehicles at most. According to the driver:

Two other witnesses said that McGrath had asked for a second engine if more carriages were added and had been refused by the station master, as none was available; McGrath (in supplementary evidence given "through the railway company's officers") denied this. The station master's evidence was that the discussion was about adding further carriages to the fifteen with which the locomotive had arrived. The general manager's chief clerk was to accompany the excursion; he suggested that the engine of the routine train that would be following twenty minutes behind could assist the excursion up the bank, or that some carriages could be left to come on with the routine train. Following his conversation with the station master, however, McGrath refused the assistance.

The train therefore set off with fifteen carriages, containing about 940 passengers. The carriages were full, and some passengers travelled with the guards. Tickets were checked before setting off and to prevent people without tickets joining the excursion; once each compartment had been checked its doors were locked.

Initially the train made progress up the steep gradient at about  but stalled about  before the top of the gradient.

Dividing the excursion train
To prevent the train rolling back, the brakes were applied. The train did have continuous brakes, (i.e., all carriages had brakes which could be operated by the driver), but they were of the non-automatic vacuum type. They were applied by creation of vacuum in the brake pipes and released by admitting air to the pipe.

This was the opposite of the arrangement preferred by the Board of Trade ('automatic continuous brakes') in which brakes were held off by vacuum (or compressed air) generated by the engine, so that on loss of vacuum (e.g. from a leaky connection or a connection parting) the brakes came on automatically. The two brake vans, however, (one immediately behind the engine tender, the other at the rear of the train) also had hand-operated brakes, each under the control of a guard. These were applied.

Owing to limited siding capacity at Hamilton's Bawn, only the front five vehicles could be taken on there; so the rearmost ten vehicles would have to be left standing on the running line. Once this rear portion was uncoupled from the front portion, the continuous brakes on it would be released, and the only brakes holding it against the gradient would be the hand-operated brakes in the rear brake van.

For a goods (freight) train in a similar situation, the wheels would have been 'scotched' against roll-back, and guard's vans on goods trains carried 'sprags' with which to do this. Those on passenger trains with continuous brakes were not required to carry sprags, and the excursion train did not. The guard in the rear van having applied his handbrake then (on the instructions of the chief clerk) dismounted and scotched the wheels of his van with pieces of ballast. He then also scotched the near rearmost vehicle on its righthand wheels and intended to similarly scotch its lefthand wheels before going back down the track with flags and detonators to protect the train from the scheduled service which was to set off from Armagh 20 minutes after the excursion.

The train was screw-coupled; each carriage was first coupled by a loose chain and hook coupling to the next; the slack on this was then taken up by a turnbuckle screw arrangement, until the buffers of the two carriages were touching. To uncouple, there needed to be some slack in the coupling; as the train had stopped all the couplings were under tension. Once the vacuum brake connection to the rear portion was broken, any attempt to introduce slack into the coupling between the two portions would be defeated by the rear portion settling back to rest its weight upon the rear van brakes. To assist uncoupling the front van guard therefore scotched one of the wheels of the sixth vehicle, that is, the front vehicle of the rear portion being detached. Loosening the turnbuckle thus transferred the weight of the rear portion to the scotch on the sixth vehicle, rather than to the rear van brakes. The couplings to the rear of the sixth vehicle remained under tension, and the slack introduced remained in the coupling between the fifth and sixth vehicles, which could be unhooked.

The rear carriages run away 
The uncoupling accomplished by the front van guard, the driver attempted to start the front portion away. It rolled back slightly, jolting the rear portion; which caused the wheels of the front vehicle of the rear portion to ride up over the stones underneath them. The rear portion had been standing with its couplings tight, but now only the rear two vehicles were in any way restrained, so that the leading eight vehicles of the rear portion fell back on to them.

The momentum of the eight vehicles closing on the rear two was sufficient to push them over the stones, crushing them in turn, so that now only the handbrake on the rear brake van was effective. It was overcome by the weight of ten vehicles, and the rear portion began to move downhill and gathered speed down the steep gradient back towards Armagh Station.

The train crew reversed the front portion and tried to catch the rear portion and re-couple it, but this proved to be impossible.

Collision

The line was operated on the time interval system (rather than block working) so that there was no means at Armagh of knowing that the line was not clear. The required 20-minute interval before letting a fast train follow a slow one having elapsed, the following scheduled passenger train had left Armagh.

The engine of the scheduled train overturned, and the connection to its tender was lost. This train was also fitted with 'simple' (non-automatic) continuous vacuum brakes, and these were lost when the engine became disconnected. The train split into two sections, both running back down the gradient towards Armagh. Application of the handbrakes on the tender and on the brake van brought the front and rear halves of the scheduled train to a stop without further incident, a witness telling the inspector "The tender was slightly damaged, but none of the vehicles, and I heard from the guard that a horse in the box next the tender was not injured".

The occupants of the rear of the excursion train were not so lucky. The two rearmost vehicles of the excursion train were utterly destroyed, and the third rearmost very badly damaged. The debris tumbled down a  embankment.

Causes of the runaway

Inadequate application of brakes 
However, he did criticise the allocation of an engine with only just enough power for such a duty, especially with a driver who had little knowledge of the route. A further practical trial showed that a single brake van, with the brake correctly working and correctly applied, could (without the aid of scotching) hold 10 carriages on the Armagh bank, against both their own weight and a nudge similar to that which witnesses agreed in describing as having been caused by run-back of the front portion of the divided train. Hence, the problem was not the inadequacy of the brake. The immediate cause was the want of the application of sufficient brake power to hold the rear portion of the excursion train, when this portion, consisting of nine coaches and a brake van; which had been separated from the front of the train by direction of Mr. Elliott, was slightly bumped by the front portion of the train when the driver had to set back previously to starting for Hamilton's Bawn.
Two witnesses had seen the brake working properly before the train left Armagh, and the brake apparatus had been found in the wreckage and appeared to be in good working order. Nonetheless, the rear portion had run away, and had done so with the braked wheels revolving freely. Therefore, either the brake had not been applied properly by the guard, or it had been tampered with by passengers in the brake carriage. In the circumstances, the guard should be given the benefit of the doubt.

Incorrect response to the excursion train stalling
Responsibility lay primarily with Mr Elliott, the chief clerk. He had directed a course of action which ignored Company rules. These laid down that the main guard should not leave his van until perfectly satisfied that his brake would hold the train (the train should therefore have been allowed to ease back upon the rear brake van); once he had left his brake, no attempt should be made to move the train until he was back at the brake. Meanwhile, the more junior guard should have gone back down the track to protect the train. These precautions had been omitted, to pursue a strategy (dividing the train) which, even had nothing gone wrong, would have had no advantages over awaiting the scheduled train to assist the excursion to Hamilton's Bawn.
If Mr. Elliott had therefore only had the prudence to wait where the excursion train stopped near the top of the bank and to send back one of the guards to protect his train, with instructions to ask the driver of the following ordinary train to help the excursion train up the short remaining distance, he would hardly have lost time and would, besides, have avoided the risk inseparable from the delicate operation he unwisely determined to carry out and which should have been resorted to under only most exceptional circumstances and not, as in the present case, where there was so easy a solution of the difficulty.

Other criticisms

Wrong driver, wrong engine 
The inspector considered that its failure to do so must have been "due to some want of proper management of the engine" by its insufficiently experienced driver. The locomotive shed foreman at Dundalk was criticised for want of judgment in not sending a more experienced driver and in his choice of engine. The 2-4-0 supplied would have had insufficient margins (even when hauling a 13-vehicle excursion train) to be sure of maintaining a safe speed over the more onerous gradients farther up the line. For a 15-vehicle excursion, assistance should have been given by the engine of the regular train.

Failure to provide an assisting engine 
The report criticised the "over-confidence" of the excursion engine driver as to the capabilities of his engine and regretted that his better judgment must have been overcome by the words of the Armagh station master. The chief clerk came in for further criticism for not having persisted with his instructions for the regular train engine to provide assistance. There was no direct criticism of the station master; either for having increased the size of the train, or for persuading the engine driver to attempt Armagh bank without assistance.

The excursion train 
The organisation of this was criticised on a number of points:
Passengers should not have been allowed to travel in the brake vans, "a practice that should be sternly prohibited"
Carriage doors should not have been locked: "a wrong thing"
Given the weight of the train and the gradients on the line, both brake vans should have been at the rear of the train
It should not have been so big:

Findings of the inquest 
The inquest was completed on Friday 21 June 1889, and made findings of culpable negligence against six of those involved; those at Dundalk responsible for selection of the engine, the driver and both guards on the train, and Mr Elliott who had taken charge. As a result, three of the accused were committed for trial for manslaughter on the following Monday. One guard had been injured in the crash and was presumably still in hospital; the Dundalk personnel were not charged, the 'practical trial' showing that the engine supplied should not have been defeated by Armagh bank if correctly handled having been carried out on Saturday 22 June. The jury are not reported to have made any findings against more senior management of the Great Northern Railway of Ireland. Elliott was tried in Dublin in August, when the jury reported they were unable to agree; on re-trial in October he was acquitted. The cases against the other defendants were then dropped.

Recommendation and consequent legislation

Recommendation triggering legislation
The key recommendation was in fact couched as a finding:

Regulatory background

For many years the Railway Inspectorate of the Board of Trade had been advocating three vital safety measures (among others) to often reluctant railway managements:

lock interlocking of points and signals, so that conflicting signal indications are prevented
block A space-interval or absolute block system of signalling, where one train is not allowed to enter a physical section until the preceding one had left it
brake Continuous brakes, to put at the command of the engine driver adequate braking power; this requirement being increased as the technology made it reasonable to 'automatic' (in modern parlance 'fail-safe') continuous brakes which had to be 'held off' by vacuum or compressed air and would be applied automatically if that supply was lost (e.g. if a train were divided).

The Board of Trade had got as far and as fast as it could by persuasion, but an inspector commented in 1880 after the Wennington Junction rail crash:

Questions in Parliament
In the aftermath of the accident, questions to the President of the Board of Trade Sir Michael Hicks Beach revealed that

 in the whole of Ireland only one engine and six vehicles were equipped with an automatic continuous brake
 in England 18% of the passenger rolling stock had no continuous brake, and a further 22% had non-automatic brakes
 in Scotland 40% of the passenger rolling stock were without continuous brakes

More specifically, for the Great Northern of Ireland:
in March 1888 there were 208 drivers and firemen employed and 693 occasions on which they worked a 14-hour day or longer, including two in which they worked over 18 hours
 of the 518 miles of railway it worked, only 23 were worked on the block system
 It had no engines or vehicles whose brakes met the requirements of the Board of Trade, furthermore:

New legislation
The government was already short of parliamentary time in which to pass legislation it was already committed to, and had promised to introduce no further controversial measures. A bill was drafted and introduced, only to be withdrawn when it became clear that some of its other provisions (most notably requiring specified improvements in couplings, so that those engaged in shunting could safely uncouple wagons without having to step into the gap between them) were sufficiently contentious as to jeopardise passage of the non-controversial portions of the bill. For that reason, some Liberal MPs sympathetic to railwaymen's concerns on working hours and the hazards of shunting expressed disappointment that the bill did not go far enough. On the other hand, during the second reading a Liberal MP made the classic argument against detailed and prescriptive regulation:

Nonetheless, within two months of the Armagh disaster Parliament had enacted the Regulation of Railways Act 1889, which authorised the Board of Trade to require the use of continuous automatic brakes on passenger railways, along with the block system of signalling and the interlocking of all points and signals. This is often taken as the beginning of the modern era in UK rail safety.

Similar accidents 
 Round Oak rail accident – 1 in 75; 23 August 1858 – Excursion runaway; brake not applied
 Abergele rail disaster – 26 August 1868 – Brake broken by rough shunting
 Stairfoot rail accident – 12 September 1870 – Poorly secured wagons runaway due to rough shunting
 Murulla railway accident (26 killed) – 13 September 1926 – Air brake failure
 Bouhalouane train crash (131 killed) – 27 January 1982 – Passenger carriage roll back after being disconnected from a locomotive on a steep slope.
 13 die near Kisumu, Kenya, after a passenger train rolls back because of air brake failure – 15 August 2000
 Tenga rail disaster – 25 May 2002
 Igandu train disaster – 24 June 2002

See also 

 History of rail transport in Ireland
 Lists of rail accidents
 List of steepest gradients on adhesion railways

Notes and references
Notes

References

Further reading

External links
Major General Hutchinson's report into the circumstances of the disaster, with original witness statements (Archive) – Railways Archive Website

1889 in Ireland 
1889 disasters in Ireland 
Transport in County Armagh
Railway accidents in 1889
Runaway train disasters
Armagh (city)
History of County Armagh
19th century in County Armagh
Accidents and incidents involving Great Northern Railway (Ireland)
June 1889 events
Train collisions in Northern Ireland